The world record progression of the men's speed skating team pursuit over eight laps as recognised by the International Skating Union:

References 

World Team Pursuit Men